Kibbutzim College of Education, Technology and the Arts (Seminar HaKibbutzim) is a college based in Tel Aviv, Israel. The college specialises in teacher training, offering B.Ed and M.Ed degrees, and is the largest academic college in Israel, with over 6,000 students. Around a quarter of teachers in Israel graduated from the college.

History
The college was established in 1939 by the Kibbutz Movement in order to train teachers for kibbutz schools.

References

External links
Official website

Colleges in Israel
1939 establishments in Mandatory Palestine
Educational institutions established in 1939